Jangipur Government Polytechnic, is a government polytechnic located in Raghunathganj, Jangipur, Murshidabad district, West Bengal. It is affiliated to the West Bengal State Council of Technical Education, and recognized by the All India Council for Technical Education. It offers diploma courses in civil engineering, electrical engineering, and electronics and communication engineering. The campus is situated beside the Bhagirathi River.

References

External links
 

Universities and colleges in Murshidabad district
Technical universities and colleges in West Bengal
Educational institutions in India with year of establishment missing